Jersey is a census-designated place (CDP) in Licking County, in the U.S. state of Ohio.

Demographics

History
Jersey was laid out in 1832, taking its name from Jersey Township. A post office was established at Jersey in 1833, and remained in operation until 1907.

References

Census-designated places in Licking County, Ohio
Census-designated places in Ohio
1832 establishments in Ohio
Populated places established in 1832